Xanthiria is a genus of moths of the family Noctuidae.

Species
 Xanthiria primulina (Druce, 1889)

References
Natural History Museum Lepidoptera genus database
Xanthiria at funet

Hadeninae